KATZ-FM (100.3 MHz, "The Beat") is a radio station serving the area of St. Louis, Missouri, United States, with a mainstream urban format. The iHeartMedia (previously Clear Channel Communications) outlet broadcasts with an ERP of 17 kW and is licensed to Bridgeton, Missouri.  Its transmitter is located in Overland, and operates from studios in St. Louis south of Forest Park.

History

Early years/The "Original" 100.3 The Beat
100.3 FM, which signed on in September 1961 as WOKZ-FM in Alton, Illinois, originally inherited the R&B format under the call letters WZEN, "Disco 100" (which began on April 18, 1979), which would later change call letters to KATZ-FM in 1988. But under its original owners, it was never successful and was always behind KMJM in terms of ratings and audience, which dates back to their days as rival disco outlets in the late 1970s. In 1980, the station flipped to CHR, and then flipped to urban AC the following year.

After KMJM's owners bought KATZ and became its sister station in the 1990s, they would go through a flux of formats, including jazz as "Jazz 100", urban oldies, Smooth jazz as KNJZ (which started on April 18, 1994, after a weekend stunt of all-Kenny G music), and then back to Urban AC (as "Kiss 100.3", which started on September 11, 1995). But that all came to an end on April 1, 1999, when it swapped formats with KMJM. KMJM picked up the Urban AC format of KATZ; in return, KATZ picked up the urban contemporary format from KMJM, and rebranded as "100.3 The Beat." For a while, it had performed successfully under Clear Channel ownership and had proven to be a good complement to Rhythmic-leaning Top 40 sister KSLZ. Its competitors were Urban station WHHL and Urban AC station WFUN-FM. (KATZ-AM is now an Urban Gospel station.)

KATZ-FM had picked up the Steve Harvey Morning Show, a show syndicated through Premiere Radio Networks, owned by KATZ-FM parent Clear Channel Communications, on November 27, 2006. At first, it seemed that KMJM should have gotten the show because it plays music on an Urban AC format due to Steve's history of not playing songs with "questionable" content – primarily rap.  But KATZ was chosen because Clear Channel did not see it fit to replace Tony Scott, who was doing AM drive at KMJM. At first, it was odd, but KATZ was now among many urban/hip hop stations with a free pass to air the Black-adult aimed Steve Harvey Morning Show along with others such as KPRS in Kansas City, WKKV in Milwaukee, KDAY in Los Angeles, and WJHM in Orlando for example.

However, after changes in programming at the Clear Channel St. Louis cluster, the Steve Harvey Morning Show began running on KMJM, with former morning host Tony Scott being displaced to PM Drive.

"Beat" Ends; "Sound" Debuts

In September 2009, the station's ratings began to slide. Clear Channel announced that they would end "The Beat" and go with a new format, with "The Beat" being relocated to the station's secondary HD Radio subchannel. At 12 p.m. on October 30, 2009, after playing Boyz II Men's End of the Road, KATZ-FM began stunting with Halloween music as "Halloween 100.3". On November 1, the station began stunting with Christmas music under the name "Christmas 100.3". Finally, at 12:01 a.m. on December 26, 2009, "100.3 The Sound" debuted with a Modern Adult Contemporary/Modern Rock hybrid format and new call letters WSDD. The first song played on "The Sound" was Owl City's "Fireflies". On October 2, 2010, WSDD moved its transmitter to Overland, Missouri and its city of license to Bridgeton, Missouri.  Despite an overall decrease in power, the new signal now covers a greater portion of the population core of the St. Louis area.

Gen X Radio
On December 26, 2010, exactly one year after its debut, WSDD flipped to an all-90s hits format and adopted the "GenX Radio" moniker. The first song on "GenX Radio" was "Get Ready For This" by 2 Unlimited. Although the format emphasized songs from the 1990s, they also played hits from the 1980s, 2000s, and some remaining currents from the previous format. On January 3, 2011, WSDD changed their call letters to WSGX to go with the "Gen X" branding.

The Brew
On May 23, 2012, at Noon, WSGX changed their format to classic rock, branded as "100.3 The Brew". The final song on "GenX" was "No Rain" by Blind Melon, while the first song on "The Brew" was "I Wanna Rock" by Twisted Sister. On July 10, 2012, WSGX changed its call letters to KBWX. During its run as "The Brew", the station aired the Indianapolis-based Bob & Tom Show in morning drive.

Majic 100.3
On November 7, 2012, at 9 a.m., just five months after The Brew's debut, KBWX ended the classic rock format, and became the new home of KMJM's urban adult contemporary format, and rebranded as "Majic 100.3" (their former frequency, 104.9 FM, flipped to Rhythmic CHR and took the KBWX calls, while 100.3 received the KMJM-FM call letters a few days later on November 15). In March 2013, the station shifted its playlist to include more current and recurrent hip hop music, similar to KMJM's former wide-ranging urban contemporary format before altering to Urban AC in 1999. Due to low ratings, the station dropped most hip hop music in early 2014.

"Beat" returns

On November 18, 2014, at Noon, the station returned to the "100.3 The Beat" moniker, and flipped to a Classic hip hop format. On September 30, 2016, at Noon, the format was shifted back to urban contemporary, returning the format to the frequency after 7 years and 5 other formats. The move comes along with the addition of the syndicated Breakfast Club for mornings.

On December 12, 2017, the station changed call letters back to KATZ-FM.

References

External links

Radio stations established in 1961
1961 establishments in Missouri
Mainstream urban radio stations in the United States
IHeartMedia radio stations
ATZ-FM